Amy Connell is a Scottish karateka. She is a two-time bronze medalist at the European Karate Championships.

She competed in the women's 55 kg event at the 2019 European Games held in Minsk, Belarus. In 2021, she competed in the women's 55 kg event at the World Karate Championships held in Dubai, United Arab Emirates where she was eliminated in her first match.

She won one of the bronze medals in the women's 55 kg event at the 2022 European Karate Championships held in 
Gaziantep, Turkey.

Achievements

References 

Living people
Year of birth missing (living people)
Place of birth missing (living people)
Scottish female karateka
European Games competitors for Great Britain
Karateka at the 2019 European Games
21st-century Scottish women